Hydrografbreen ("The Hydrographer Glacier") is a glacier in Oscar II Land at Spitsbergen, Svalbard. The glacier has a length about eight kilometers, and extends from the mountain range of Holmesletfjella to Jørgenfjellet.

References

Glaciers of Spitsbergen